Garcia IV or Garcia IV Nkanga (died 1752) was ruler of the Kingdom of Kongo (1743–1752). He ruled in a period of "rotating lineages", which was a plan reportedly devised by Pedro IV of Kongo. Garcia IV had once been the Marquis of Matari.

References 

1752 deaths
Manikongo of Kongo